This is a list of cemeteries in Delaware, United States.

New Castle County 

Delaware
Cemeteries